Lizard is the third studio album by British progressive rock band King Crimson, released in December 1970 by Island Records in the UK, and in January 1971 by Atlantic Records in the United States and Canada. It was the second consecutive King Crimson album recorded by transitional line-ups of the group that did not perform live, following In the Wake of Poseidon. This is the only album by the band to feature singer and bass guitarist Gordon Haskell (apart from his appearance singing "Cadence and Cascade" on the previous album) and drummer Andy McCulloch as official members of the band.

Background and production

Haskell was previously a classmate of Robert Fripp at Queen Elizabeth's grammar school in Wimborne near Bournemouth, the pair having subsequently played together in the local band The League of Gentlemen. Haskell later contributed vocals to the King Crimson track "Cadence and Cascade" on In the Wake of Poseidon, after Greg Lake left the band to join Emerson, Lake & Palmer. Fripp asked Haskell to become an official member of King Crimson for the recording of Lizard. Another supporting musician on In the Wake of Poseidon, saxophonist/flautist Mel Collins was also asked to become a full-time member, as was drummer Andy McCulloch, who replaced Michael Giles. The group was then augmented with session musicians, including another In the Wake of Poseidon alumnus, the noted jazz pianist Keith Tippett, together with Yes vocalist Jon Anderson, and brass/woodwind players Robin Miller, Mark Charig, and Nick Evans.

Haskell and McCulloch had an unhappy experience recording Lizard, finding it difficult to connect with the material, especially Haskell as a devotee of soul and Motown music. During rehearsals for a prospective tour following the album's completion, Haskell left King Crimson. He sought legal redress for the next 19 years because he believed he had been cheated out of royalties owed him for the album. Shortly after Haskell left the group, McCulloch did likewise. The press release drafted by Sinfield to promote Lizard wryly quoted Max Ehrmann's poem "Desiderata", which contains advice on how to chart a true course through confusion.

Collins, on the other hand, remained in King Crimson with Fripp and Sinfield for the recording of the group's next album, Islands. Haskell was replaced with Boz Burrell on bass guitar and vocals, while McCulloch was replaced with his sometime housemate Ian Wallace. The Islands line-up of the group would finally give some of the Lizard material a live airing, with "Cirkus" and "Lady of the Dancing Water" becoming part of King Crimson's touring repertoire. "Cirkus" would also later become part of the touring repertoire of the 21st Century Schizoid Band, whose members included Mel Collins and Jakko Jakszyk.

In 2016, for the band's biggest European tour since 1974, "Cirkus" was included in the repertoire, as well as "Dawn Song", which is part of the "Lizard" suite and was played live for the first time ever.  For the 2017 North American tour, "Dawn Song" was expanded to the entire "Battle of Glass Tears" section (adding "Last Skirmish" and "Prince Rupert's Lament", neither of which had ever been performed live). The "Bolero" section was added to the live repertoire for the band's 2018 European tour.

Album cover

Lizards outside cover art is by Gini Barris, who was commissioned to produce it by Peter Sinfield. The inside cover consists of the song lyrics and credits printed over a marbled pattern, credited to Koraz Wallpapers, a company run by Barris' boyfriend at the time.

The album's outside cover consists of the words 'King Crimson' spelled out in ornate medieval lettering, the word 'King' on the back cover and the word 'Crimson' on the front cover, with each letter incorporating one or two discrete images. These images in turn represent Sinfield's lyrics from the album – the images in the word 'King' representing the lyrics of the various sections and subsections of track 5, "Lizard"; while the images in the word 'Crimson' represent the lyrics of tracks 1–4. Whereas the images representing "Lizard" are medieval in content – depicting Prince Rupert, his environs (including a peacock), and the Battle of Glass Tears – the images representing the other four tracks juxtapose medieval and contemporary scenes. The image around the letter 'i' in 'Crimson', for example, depicts the Beatles, corresponding with their pseudonymous appearance in the lyrics to "Happy Family". Around the "n" on the front cover, there is a depiction of Rupert the Bear piloting a yellow aeroplane.

In his book Prog Rock FAQ, Will Romano called Barris' work "one of the era's most beautifully strange pieces of album cover artwork". In an interview with Romano, Barris said that Lizard was "one of my first jobs" since studying graphics at the Central School of Art and Design in London. She contacted Sinfield after hearing he needed an artist to produce a cover for Lizard. When she suggested creating medieval miniatures, a passion of hers, Sinfield "went for it" and commissioned her to do the job. Barris recalled that she did not hear the music until after the album's release, but worked from the lyrics Sinfield had given her. She cited the Lindisfarne Gospel and Très Riches Heures du Duc de Berry illuminated manuscripts as inspiration for her work.

Release

Released on 10 December 1970 by Island Records (catalog no. ILPS 9141), Lizard reached number 29 in the UK Albums Chart. The album was released in the United States and Canada by Atlantic Records on 3 January 1971 (catalog no. SD 8278), where it would reach number 113 in Billboard. Lizard was released by Atlantic at the same time as two other albums on the label featuring ex-King Crimson members: Emerson, Lake & Palmer's debut album (featuring Greg Lake), and the lone release by Ian McDonald and Michael Giles.

The album had CD releases in 1989 and 2001, each newly remastered by Fripp at the time. The newest version was released in October 2009, containing a 5.1 Surround Sound mix on DVD-Audio, created by British musician and producer Steven Wilson in collaboration with Fripp, as well as a new stereo transfer based on the surround mix.

Reception

Since the album is more jazz-inflected sounding than many of the band's other works and many of its tracks idiosyncratic, responses towards the album have been varied since its release. Music critic Robert Christgau rated the album a B−, saying that the "jazziness" of the album projected a "certain cerebral majesty" but criticized Peter Sinfield's lyrics, qualifying them as "overwrought".

In his retrospective review, AllMusic's Dave Lynch described it as, "Seamlessly blending rock, jazz, and classical in a way that few albums have successfully achieved, Lizard is epic, intimate, cacophonic, and subtle by turn – and infused with the dark moods first heard when "21st Century Schizoid Man" and "Epitaph" reached listeners' ears the previous year." Classic Rock reviewer described Lizard as "a decidedly Miles Davis-influenced hodgepodge of classical and jazz influences brought to their logical, near-chaotic end" and defined its music "mind-bending, unclassifiable creative stuff."

Robert Fripp has been very critical of the album, calling it "unlistenable" and lovers of it as "very strange". However, he revised his opinion upon listening to Steven Wilson's surround-sound mix of the album for the 40th anniversary reissue, proclaiming, "For the first time I have heard the Music in the music."

In 2011, PopMatters named the title track at #13 in the list "The 25 Best Progressive Rock Songs of All Time."

Track listing
All songs written by Robert Fripp and Peter Sinfield.

Personnel
King Crimson
Robert Fripp – guitar, Mellotron (1, 2, 5), EMS VCS 3 (2), Hammond organ (2), devices, production
Peter Sinfield – lyrics, EMS VCS 3 (2, 3), pictures, sleeve conception, production
Mel Collins – saxophone, flute
Gordon Haskell – bass guitar, vocals
Andy McCulloch – drums

Additional musicians
Keith Tippett – acoustic and electric pianos
Robin Miller – oboe, English horn
Mark Charig – cornet
Nick Evans – trombone
Jon Anderson – vocals (5-a)

Other personnel
Robin Thompson – engineering
Geoff Workman – tapes
Gini Barris – outside painting
Koraz Wallpapers – inside marbling
C.C.S. – typography

Charts

References

External links
 
Lizard on Elephant Talk, including lyrics
Analysis of Lizard by Jon Green, creator of the Promenade the Puzzle: The Poetic Vision of Peter Sinfield website
Analysis of "Cirkus" and "Lizard" part 4 ("Big Top") by composer Andrew Keeling
King Crimson official website

King Crimson albums
1970 albums
Island Records albums
Atlantic Records albums
Vertigo Records albums
Polydor Records albums
E.G. Records albums
Virgin Records albums
Albums produced by Robert Fripp
Albums produced by Peter Sinfield